Sophiothrips is a genus of thrips in the family Phlaeothripidae.

Species
 Sophiothrips aleurodisci
 Sophiothrips annulatus
 Sophiothrips bicolor
 Sophiothrips boltoni
 Sophiothrips breviceps
 Sophiothrips canberrae
 Sophiothrips comptus
 Sophiothrips crassicollis
 Sophiothrips darwini
 Sophiothrips decorus
 Sophiothrips duvali
 Sophiothrips greensladei
 Sophiothrips kibbyi
 Sophiothrips makaronesicus
 Sophiothrips martinae
 Sophiothrips mongae
 Sophiothrips nigrus
 Sophiothrips panamensis
 Sophiothrips parviceps
 Sophiothrips peculiaris
 Sophiothrips placodes
 Sophiothrips politus
 Sophiothrips postlei
 Sophiothrips spadix
 Sophiothrips squamosus
 Sophiothrips terminalis
 Sophiothrips tumidus
 Sophiothrips typicus
 Sophiothrips unicolor
 Sophiothrips verrucosus
 Sophiothrips vorticosus

References

Phlaeothripidae
Thrips
Thrips genera